Malone is a village in, and the county seat of, Franklin County, New York, United States. Its population was 5,911 at the 2010 census. The village is in the town of Malone. It is home to a campus of North Country Community College.

History 
The community was first settled around 1802. During the War of 1812, the village was sacked by British troops making incursions from what would become Canada.

Malone was incorporated as a village in 1853. It served as a staging point for one arm of the 1866 and 1870 Fenian raids of Canada, which took place at many points along the Canada–United States border. The Fenian Brotherhood (Fenians) attempted to capture Canada to end British rule of Ireland.

Laura Ingalls Wilder wrote the book Farmer Boy about Almanzo Wilder, who attended Franklin Academy here. The First Congregational Church, likely the one mentioned in Farmer Boy, was the first Christian congregation founded and the first church building built in Franklin County. There is anecdotal evidence that the second church building (1852–1883) was one of the final stops in the Underground Railroad. A tunnel for the persons seeking freedom can still be found in the church's basement.

In 1935, Dutch Schultz had his tax evasion trial moved from Manhattan to Malone. After a media-saturated trial before a Malone-area jury, he was acquitted. In 1998, the village suffered a natural disaster as part of the North American Ice Storm of 1998. On November 6, 2012, a proposal to dissolve the village into the surrounding town of Malone was defeated by a 2-to-1 margin, with village residents voting 1,117–562 to keep the village intact.

In addition to the First Congregational Church and Wilder Homestead, the Horton Gristmill, Anselm Lincoln House, Malone Armory, Malone Freight Depot, Paddock Building, and United States Post Office are listed on the National Register of Historic Places.

Economy

Primarily a farming community, Malone is surrounded by dairy farms and potato producers, and was previously known for growing hops.

The New York Central and Rutland Railroads once had major switching and maintenance yards here.

Products manufactured in Malone included Sno-Pruf waterproofer for boots, woolen winter wear produced by Ballard Mill, and Sioux-Mocs slippers. Malone became known as the snowmobile capital of the United States when a local farm equipment dealer agreed to become the exclusive distributor for Bombardier Recreational Products east of the Mississippi.

A number of prisons have been built in the vicinity, becoming major employers.   

The latest economic controversy to impact the community is the advent of significant wind farms in the region. Several decades ago, local farmers staged protests against the eminent domain-backed incursion of 765 MW transmission lines that crossed their pastures to bring Saint Lawrence Seaway power through Northern New York to downstate urban users. 

Geography 
Malone village is located in the northern part of the town of Malone at  (44.850676, −74.28907), in north-central Franklin County.

Malone is at the convergence of U.S. Route 11, New York State Route 11B (NY 11B), NY 30, and NY 37. County Road 25 enters the village from the south. US-11 leads east  to Champlain and southwest  to Potsdam. NY-30 leads south  to Tupper Lake in the Adirondacks and north  to Trout River at the Canada–US border.

The Salmon River, a tributary of the St. Lawrence River, flows northward through the village.

Climate
The climate of Malone is hemiboreal (Köppen climate classification "Dfb").

Demographics 

As of the census of 2000, there were 6,075 people, 2,583 households, and 1,511 families residing in the village. The population density was 1,920.0 people per square mile (742.3/km2). There were 2,847 housing units at an average density of 899.8 per square mile (347.9/km2). The racial makeup of the village was 97.58% White, 0.49% Black or African American, 0.46% Native American, 0.51% Asian, 0.44% from other races, and 0.51% from two or more races. Hispanic or Latino of any race were 1.05% of the population.

There were 2,583 households, out of which 28.5% had children under the age of 18 living with them, 38.6% were married couples living together, 15.2% had a female householder with no husband present, and 41.5% were non-families. 36.0% of all households were made up of individuals, and 17.4% had someone living alone who was 65 years of age or older. The average household size was 2.24 and the average family size was 2.86.

In the village, the population was spread out, with 23.0% under the age of 18, 7.6% from 18 to 24, 26.1% from 25 to 44, 22.9% from 45 to 64, and 20.4% who were 65 years of age or older. The median age was 40 years. For every 100 females, there were 81.8 males. For every 100 females age 18 and over, there were 76.9 males.

The median income for a household in the village was $25,200, and the median income for a family was $35,077. Males had a median income of $29,200 versus $20,163 for females. The per capita income for the village was $15,960. About 10.8% of families and 16.4% of the population were below the poverty line, including 21.8% of those under age 18 and 11.6% of those age 65 or over.

Government and infrastructure
Upstate Correctional Facility, a prison of the New York State Department of Corrections and Community Supervision, is near the town.

References

External links
 
 Early history of the Malone area
  North Country Community College
 Titus Mountain Ski Area
 Malone Golf Club
  Read or listen to the Oral history of Malone in the late 19th early 20th Centuries
 Franklin County Historical & Museum Society

Populated places established in 1853
County seats in New York (state)
Villages in Franklin County, New York
Villages in New York (state)